CVC may refer to:

Science and technology
 Compact Video Cassette, a quarter-inch video cassette format
 Card verification code, a security feature on credit cards
 Card Verifiable Certificate, a format for digital certificates usable by smart cards
 Central venous catheter, or central line
 Chronic venous congestion
 Citrus variegated chlorosis
 CVC theorem prover
 Current–voltage characteristic
 Conserved vector current
 Contractile vacuole complex

Organizations
 Canning Vale College, in Perth, Western Australia
 Central Vigilance Commission, India
 Centro Velico Caprera, Italy
 Colonial Valley Conference, a high school athletic conference in New Jersey, US
 Comberton Village College, in Comberton, UK
 Continental Volleyball Conference, an NCAA Division III men's volleyball conference with members along the US East Coast
 County Voluntary Council, a voluntary sector infrastructure body in Wales
 Credit Valley Conservation, in Southern Ontario, Canada

Companies
 Citigroup Venture Capital Equity Partners, a U.S. based private equity firm renamed Court Square Capital Partners and spun out of Citigroup in 2006
 CVC Capital Partners, a European private equity firm
 Control Video Corporation, a short-lived venture that was a predecessor of AOL LLC (formerly America Online, Inc)
 Cablevision (New York Stock Exchange ticker symbol)
 Cleve Airport (IATA code), in South Australia

Other uses
 Corporate venture capital, the investment of corporate funds directly in external startup companies
 United States Capitol Visitor Center, an underground addition to the US Capitol complex
 California Vehicle Code
 Crime Victims’ Compensation, in the US and Crime Victim Compensation and Support Authority in Sweden
 Consonant–vowel–consonant, a syllable pattern

See also
 Citigroup Venture Capital (disambiguation)
 Virtual Circuit Connectivity Verification (VCCV), in pseudo-wire